The LMS (Northern Counties Committee) Class B3 4-4-0 passenger steam locomotives were rebuilds of Belfast and Northern Counties Railway (BNCR) two-cylinder compound locomotives. They operated services throughout the NCC's  broad gauge system in the north-east of Ireland.

History 
The locomotives that comprised the Northern Counties Committee Class B3 were rebuilds of two classes of BNCR "Light Compounds". These had been built by Beyer, Peacock and Company in the 1890s to the design of the BNCR Locomotive Engineer Bowman Malcolm. The first two members of the class were originally Class C Light Compound 2-4-0s. Rebuilding began with No. 28 in 1927 and  No. 21 in the following year. The other three Class B3 locomotives (24, 60 and 61) were derived from Class B Light Compounds whose only original difference was that they had always been 4-4-0s and not 2-4-0s.

However, before alteration to Class B3, Nos. 60 and 61 had already undergone an earlier rebuilding to become Class B1 compounds in 1921 to be followed by No. 51 in August 1926. By contrast, No. 24 was rebuilt as a simple (i.e. not compound) in February 1925 to become the solitary member of the somewhat ephemeral Class B2.

All five engines had  cylinders with  piston valves and retained their  driving wheels. The first three members of the class had boilers rated at  but Nos.60 and 61 had the advantage of  boilers.

During rebuilding, they were fitted with LMS standard boilers that had to be placed higher than the originals to allow the firebox and ash pan to clear the rear driving wheel axle. The smokebox saddle was extended accordingly to offer support. The closely coupled driving wheels accentuated the appearance of the high-pitched boiler, earning these engines the nickname of "Whippet" because of a perceived resemblance to the breed of racing dog. 
 
All members of the class were officially named after Ulster counties.

No. 28 was withdrawn in December 1938, having run just over a quarter million miles in her rebuilt form. The remaining locomotives served throughout World War II and were scrapped in 1946–1947.

Building and withdrawal data

The following table summarises the rebuilding and renumbering history of the Class B3 locomotives.

Livery
The Class B3 locomotives were painted in crimson lake with yellow and black lining. The LMS crest was carried on the upper cab sides. The initials "NCC" in shaded serif gold capital letters were placed centrally on the tender sides. Number plates were brass with raised digits and edge; they were carried on the lower cab sides with another placed centrally on the back of the tender tank. Curved nameplates were fitted above the leading driving wheel splashers. Buffer beams and number plate and name plate backgrounds were painted red. The engine number was applied to the front buffer beam in shaded gold digits.

References
 
 
 

B3
4-4-0 locomotives
Beyer, Peacock locomotives
Steam locomotives of Northern Ireland
Steam locomotives of Ireland
Passenger locomotives
Scrapped locomotives
5 ft 3 in gauge locomotives
Railway locomotives introduced in 1890